Eremophila parvifolia is a flowering plant in the figwort family, Scrophulariaceae and is endemic to Australia. It is a shrub which has small, usually egg-shaped leaves and blackish flower buds which open to purple flowers which are white with purple spots inside. There are two subspecies, both of which are found in Western Australia and one which is also found in South Australia.

Description
Its young branches and leaves are slightly sticky due to the presence of resin.

The flower buds are blackish brown but the open to purple on the outside and white with purple spots inside the tube. The petal tube is glabrous apart from the inside of the tube and the lower petal lobe which have long, soft hairs. The 4 stamens extend beyond the petal tube. Flowering time depends on subspecies.

Taxonomy and naming 
The species was first formally described by John McConnell Black in 1928 and the description was published in Transactions and Proceedings of the Royal Society of South Australia. The specific epithet (parvifolia) is derived from the Latin words parvus meaning "small" and folium meaning "leaf", referring to the small leaves of this species.

In 2007, Robert Chinnock described tow subspecies in his book Eremophila and Allied Genera: A Monograph of the Plant Family Myoporaceae, and the names are accepted by the Australian Plant Census:
 Eremophila parvifolia  J.M.Black subsp. parvifolia which is a low, spiny shrub which flowers from June to February and has glabrous, almost spherical fruits ;
 Eremophila parvifolia subsp. auricampa Chinnock which is a taller, non-spiny shrub which flowers from September to April and has cone-shaped, hairy fruits.

Distribution and habitat
Subspecies parvifolia occurs east from Balladonia in Western Australia to Fowlers Bay in South Australia. It grows in calcareous loam in woodland or shrubland.
Subspecies auricampa is common from near Norseman and Kalgoorlie to Balladonia growing in sand, loam or clay on sandplains, hillsides and the edges of salt lakes.

Conservation status
This species is classified as "not threatened" by the Western Australian Government Department of Parks and Wildlife, although the subspecies parvifolia is classified as "Priority Four" meaning that is rare or near threatened in Western Australia.

Use in horticulture
This small shrub is suitable for planting between larger plants and is very reliable, hardy and long-lived in the garden, some examples having been in cultivation for over 25 years. It can be propagated from seed or cuttings or by grafting onto Myoporum rootstock and will grow in a range of soils, including clay. It prefers a sunny position but is very drought and frost tolerant.

References

Eudicots of Western Australia
parvifolia
Flora of South Australia
Endemic flora of Western Australia
Plants described in 1928
Taxa named by John McConnell Black